The following is a list of invasive alien species (IAS) in the Philippines. These species are regarded to have a negative effect on the local ecosystem and the economy, although not all species introduced from outside the archipelago are considered as "invasive".

Notable species

Animals

Plants

References

Philippines
Philippines
Biota of the Philippines
Agriculture in the Philippines
Environmental issues in the Philippines